Con Mi Soledad is the debut album from the winner of the fourth season of Objetivo Fama, Juan Vélez. The album was released on December 11, 2007. In its first week, the album opened at number eight on the Billboard Top Latin Albums chart. The album was nominated at the 2008 Latin Billboard Awards.

Track listing

 Con Mi Soledad
 Buscando Tu Sombra
 Como Decirte Adiós
 Abandonados
 Todo Sigue Igual
 Yo Te Quiero
 Devuélveme La Vida
 Una Segunda Vez
 Tal Vez
 Así Es Mi Vida

Chart performance

Singles
All regularly released singles from the album and their peak positions on the Billboard Hot Latin Tracks (HLT) and Latin Pop Airplay (LPA) charts.

2007 debut albums
Juan Vélez albums
Spanish-language albums
Univision Records albums